Virgella is a genus of fungi within the Rhytismataceae family. This is a monotypic genus, containing the single species Virgella robusta.

References

External links
Index Fungorum

Monotypic Leotiomycetes genera